Riot in Juvenile Prison is a 1959 film directed by Edward L. Cahn and starring Jerome Thor and Scott Marlowe.

Plot
A radical plan is enacted when Dr. Paul Furman is assigned by the governor to take charge of a youth reformatory, replacing Colonel Walton, with a notion to offer inmates more trust. Not only does Furman ease the institution's usual strict discipline, he changes it from an all-boy detention facility to co-ed.

Juvenile delinquent Eddie Bassett observes with interest as new female inmates like Kitty and Babe arrive along with adult supervisors Grace Hartwell and Bess Monahan, who will look after the girls. As soon as the bashful Kitty expresses an interest in Eddie, the extroverted Babe causes trouble for her, causing Kitty to be injured in a fight and later attacked by another boy. Furman is also physically assaulted by Eddie.

Various misdeeds lead to the governor's firing Furman and restoring Walton and the previous routine of discipline. Eddie, beaten by a guard named Quillan, steals the guard's gun, knocks him out and leads a revolt. The only one able to quell the uprising is Furman, who, with Kitty's help, successfully appeals to Eddie to give up before it's too late.

Cast
 Jerome Thor as Paul A. Furman
 Scott Marlowe as Eddie Bassett
 Marcia Henderson as Grace Hartwell
 Dorothy Provine as Babe
 John Hoyt as Col. Ernest Walton
 Ann Doran as Bess Monahan
 Virginia Aldridge as Kitty Anderson
 Richard Tyler as Stu Killion (as Dick Tyler)
 Richard Reeves as Quillan

See also
 List of American films of 1959

References

External links

Riot in Juvenile Prison at TCMDB

1959 films
1959 crime drama films
American black-and-white films
American crime drama films
American prison drama films
1950s English-language films
Films directed by Edward L. Cahn
Films produced by Edward Small
Films scored by Emil Newman
United Artists films
1950s American films